Baron Kingsdown may refer to:

Thomas Pemberton Leigh, 1st Baron Kingsdown (1793-1867), British politician.
Robin Leigh-Pemberton, Baron Kingsdown (1927-2013), British lawyer and banker, kinsman of the above.

Extinct baronies in the Peerage of the United Kingdom
Noble titles created in 1858
Noble titles created in 1993
Noble titles created for UK MPs